K.C. Collins, also known as Chris Collins, is a Canadian film, voice and television actor.

Early life
He attended Monroe Community College in Rochester, New York, on a baseball scholarship, choosing this rather than options of the University of Hawaiʻi and Florida State University to stay close to his grandmother who raised him from the age of 6. He left school to pursue an acting career.

Career
Collins is best known for his roles as Hale on the Canadian television supernatural drama Lost Girl and Dr. Tom Reycraft on Saving Hope.

He received a Canadian Screen Award nomination for Best Supporting Performance in a Film at the 11th Canadian Screen Awards in 2023, for his performance as Keys in the film White Dog (Chien blanc).

Filmography

References

External links

Year of birth missing (living people)
Living people
Black Canadian male actors
Canadian male film actors
Canadian male television actors
Canadian male voice actors